The 2023 Houston Dash season is the team's tenth season as an American professional women's soccer team in the National Women's Soccer League.

Season

Pre-season
Immediately following the 2022 Houston Dash season, Houston Dash started their preparation for the 2023 NWSL Season. On November 15, 2022 the team announced that it was 14 players as worked to build their 2023 roster. The declined Valérie Gauvin's option, released Elizabeth Eddy, Cali Farquharson to free agency, and Michelle Alozie, Michaela Abam, Makamae Gomera-Stevens, Kelcie Hedge, Emily Ogle, Ally Prisock, Annika Schmidt, Natalie Jacobs, Lindsey Harris, Tiernny Wiltshire, and Brianna Visalli were all out of contract. On the same day the team announced it was purchasing Paulina Gramaglia option, after her loan. On December 8, 2022 the Dash announced that they had resigned Michelle Alozie to a new contract, adding depth to attack. December 14, 2022 the team continued to build its attacking capabilities by signing Natalie Jacobs to a new contract. Houston started working on rebuilding their defensive presence on December 19, 2022 by resigning Ally Prisock to the team. On December 21, 2022, the Houston Dash announced they had chose the fourth coach in team history, hiring Sam Laity after his term as interim coach with the OL Reign. Houston continued to work on their defensive depth for 2023 by re-signing Annika Creel (formerly Schmidt) on January 5, 2023. Continuing to shape their 2023 roster, Houston signed Devon Kerr on January 6, 2023. Kerr is a Goalkeeper who started with the Dash in their 2019 season, and has spent the last three seasons with the Washington Spirit. Houston continued to re-sign players on January 9, 2023 when they added Emily Curran (formerly Ogle) to the midfield. On January 11, 2023, the Dash announced the signing of Jamaican international midfielder Havana Solaun. Just prior to the 2023 NWSL draft, Houston announced they had traded for Diana Ordóñez and the 2023 NWSL draft 30th pick from the North Carolina Courage for their 2023 and 2024 first round pick, 2023 international slot and $100,000 in allocation money. On February 1, 2023, the Dash announced they had acquired the rights for Courtney Petersen from the Orlando Pride in addition to the Pride's natural third round pick in the 2024 NWSL draft.

Roster

.

Transactions

2023 NWSL Draft 

Draft picks are not automatically signed to the team roster. The 2023 NWSL Draft was held on January 12, 2023.

Transfers in

Transfers out

Loan out

Staff

Non-competative fixtures

Competitions

2023 National Women's Soccer League season

Regular-season standings

Results summary

Results by matchday

Season results

2023 NWSL Challenge Cup

Group stage

See also
 2023 National Women's Soccer League season
 2023 in American soccer

References

External links
 

Houston Dash
Houston Dash
Houston Dash seasons
Houston Dash